Italian submarine Balilla may refer to one of the following Italian submarines:

  was the former German U-42, acquired in 1915 by the Regia Marina and sunk in July 1916.
  was the lead boat of the s, built in 1927 and laid up in 1941.

Italian Navy ship names